
Gmina Miedziana Góra is a rural gmina (administrative district) in Kielce County, Świętokrzyskie Voivodeship, in south-central Poland.

The gmina contains part of the protected area called Suchedniów-Oblęgorek Landscape Park.

Villages
Gmina Miedziana Góra contains the villages and settlements of Bobrza, Ciosowa, Ćmińsk, Kostomłoty Drugie, Kostomłoty Pierwsze, Miedziana Góra, Porzecze, Przyjmo, Tumlin-Podgród and Tumlin-Wykień.

Neighbouring gminas
Gmina Miedziana Góra is bordered by the city of Kielce and by the gminas of Masłów, Mniów, Piekoszów, Strawczyn and Zagnańsk.

References
 Polish official population figures 2007

Miedziana Gora
Kielce County